Warren Mercer Oates (July 5, 1928 – April 3, 1982) was an American actor best known for his performances in several films directed by Sam Peckinpah, including The Wild Bunch (1969) and Bring Me the Head of Alfredo Garcia (1974). Another of his most acclaimed performances was as officer Sam Wood in In the Heat of the Night  (1967). Oates starred in numerous films during the early 1970s that have since achieved cult status, such as The Hired Hand (1971), Two-Lane Blacktop (1971), and Race with the Devil (1975). Oates also portrayed John Dillinger in the biopic Dillinger (1973) and as the supporting character U.S. Army Sergeant Hulka in the military comedy Stripes (1981). Another notable appearance was in the classic New Zealand film Sleeping Dogs (1977), in which he played the commander of the American forces in the country.

Early life
Warren Oates was born and reared in Depoy, a tiny rural community in Muhlenberg County, Kentucky, located just a few miles west of Greenville, the county seat.  According to the federal census of 1940, he was the younger of two sons born to Sarah Alice (née Mercer) and Bayless Earle Oates, who owned a general store.  His brother, Gordon, was five years his senior.  On his father's side, Warren was of English, Scottish, and Welsh ancestry. He attended Louisville Male High School in Louisville, Kentucky, until 1945, but did not graduate from that institution.  He did, however, later earn a high-school equivalency diploma. After high school, he enlisted in the United States Marine Corps for two years (1946-1948), serving in its air wing as an aircraft mechanic and reaching the rank of corporal. Oates became interested in theater while attending the University of Louisville, where in 1953, he starred in several plays produced by the school's Little Theater Company.  Four years later, in New York City, he got an opportunity to star in a live production of the television series Studio One.

Career
Oates moved to Los Angeles, where in the 1950s, he began to establish himself in guest roles in weekly television Westerns, including Wagon Train, Tombstone Territory, Buckskin, Rawhide, Trackdown, Tate, The Rebel, Wanted Dead or Alive, The Virginian, Have Gun – Will Travel, Lawman, The Big Valley, Bat Masterson, and Gunsmoke. 

In the episode "Subterranean City" (October 14, 1958) of the syndicated Rescue 8, Oates played a gang member, Pete, who is the nephew of series character Skip Johnson (Lang Jeffries). In the story line, rescuers Johnson and Wes Cameron (Jim Davis) search for a lost girl in the sewer tunnels and encounter three criminals hiding out underground. Pete soon breaks with his gang companions and joins the firemen Wes and Skip in locating the missing child.

In 1961, Oates guest-starred in the episode "Artie Moon" in NBC's The Lawless Years crime drama about the 1920s. In 1962, he appeared as Ves Painter in the short-lived ABC series Stoney Burke, co-starring Jack Lord, a program about rodeo contestants.

Oates also played in a number of guest roles on The Twilight Zone (in "The Purple Testament" and "The 7th Is Made Up of Phantoms", in which he costarred with Randy Boone and Ron Foster), The Outer Limits ("The Mutant" [1964]), Combat! ("The Pillbox" [1964]) and Lost in Space ("Welcome Stranger" [1965]). During the 1960s and 1970s, he guest-starred on such shows as Twelve O'Clock High ("The Hotshot" [1965]), Lancer, and The Virginian. While making a guest appearance on a segment of the Western television series Dundee and the Culhane, Oates managed to steal the show with his off-camera antics and bloopers that had everyone on the set rolling. After a long day of filming, he headed over and set his footprints in concrete along with all the other stars who appeared at Apacheland Movie Ranch. 

"There were 40 [Western] series, and I went from one to the other. I started out playing the third bad guy on a horse and worked my way up to the number-one bad guy," Oates once quipped. Oates did play the good guy once as Deke Bassop in the title role of the episode “The Bassops” on Gunsmoke in 1964.

Oates first met Peckinpah when he played a variety of guest roles in The Rifleman (1958–1963), a popular television series co-created and sometimes directed by Peckinpah. He also played a supporting role in Peckinpah's short-lived series The Westerner in 1960. The collaboration continued as he worked in Peckinpah's early films Ride the High Country (1962) and Major Dundee (1965) and resulted in two of his most famous film roles. In the 1969 Western classic The Wild Bunch, he portrayed Lyle Gorch, a long-time outlaw who chooses to die with his friends during the film's violent conclusion. According to his wife at the time, Teddy, Oates had the choice of starring in Support Your Local Sheriff!, to be filmed in Los Angeles, or The Wild Bunch in Mexico. "He had done Return of the Seven in Mexico; he got hepatitis, plus dysentery, but off he went again with Sam [Peckinpah]. He loved going on location. He loved the adventure of it. He had great admiration for Sam." In Bring Me the Head of Alfredo Garcia, the dark 1974 action/tragedy also filmed in Mexico, Oates played the lead role of Bennie, a hard-drinking, down-on-his-luck musician and bartender hoping to make a final score. The character was reportedly based on Peckinpah. For authenticity, Oates wore the director's sunglasses while filming scenes of the production.

Although the Peckinpah film roles are his best-known, his most critically acclaimed role is GTO in Monte Hellman's 1971 cult classic Two-Lane Blacktop. The film, although a failure at the box office, is studied in film schools as a treasure of the 1970s, in large part due to Oates' performance. Film critic Leonard Maltin remarked that Oates' performance as GTO was as good as any he had seen and should have won the Oscar. Oates had a close relationship with Hellman, and worked with him on three other films: the western film The Shooting (1966), co-starring a young Jack Nicholson, Cockfighter (1974), and China 9, Liberty 37 (1978), in which Peckinpah, who was also a friend of Hellman's, featured in a rare acting role. Oates' wife Teddy said, "Sam Peckinpah and Monte Hellman were the two directors with whom Warren would work anytime, anywhere."

In addition to Peckinpah and Hellman, Oates worked with several major directors of his era, including Leslie Stevens in the 1960 film Private Property, his first starring role; Norman Jewison in In the Heat of the Night (1967); Joseph L. Mankiewicz in There Was a Crooked Man... (1970); John Milius in Dillinger (1973); Terrence Malick in Badlands (1973); Philip Kaufman in The White Dawn (1974); William Friedkin in The Brink's Job (1978); and Steven Spielberg in 1941 (1979).

He appeared in the Sherman Brothers' musical version of Tom Sawyer (1973), as Muff Potter, the town drunk. He also starred in The Rise and Fall of Legs Diamond (1960), Return of the Seven (1966), The Split (1968), The Thief Who Came to Dinner (1973), Drum (1976), and played the title role in a 1971 crime drama, Chandler. Oates costarred three times with friend Peter Fonda in The Hired Hand (1971), Race with the Devil (1975), and 92 in the Shade (1975).

Oates was cast in Roger Donaldson's 1977 New Zealand film Sleeping Dogs together with New Zealand actor Sam Neill. A political thriller with action film elements, Sleeping Dogs follows the lead character "Smith" (Neill) as New Zealand plunges into a police state, as a fascist government institutes martial law after industrial disputes flare into violence. Smith gets caught between the special police and a growing resistance movement, and reluctantly becomes involved. Oates plays the role of Willoughby, commander of the American forces stationed in New Zealand and working with the New Zealand fascist government to find and subdue "rebels" (the resistance movement).

A year before his death, Oates costarred with Bill Murray in the 1981 military comedy Stripes. In the role of the drill sergeant, Sgt. Hulka, Oates played the straight man to Murray's comedic character. The film was a huge financial success, earning $85 million at the box office. In 1982, he costarred opposite Jack Nicholson in director Tony Richardson's The Border.

In 1981, Oates also costarred as a fanatical Southern preacher-turned-Confederate officer in The Blue and the Gray, a CBS TV miniseries that aired in November 1982. His last two films were not released until 1983: Blue Thunder and Tough Enough, both filmed in late 1981. Both films are dedicated to him, along with Monte Hellman's 1988 film Iguana, which ends with the titles "For Warren".

Death
Oates was ill with influenza in the weeks before his death.  On April 3, 1982, at the age of 53, he died of a heart attack while taking an afternoon nap at his home in Los Angeles, after having experienced chest pains and shortness of breath earlier that day. An autopsy determined that he had chronic obstructive pulmonary disease. After his funeral, in accordance with Oates' wishes, his body was cremated and his ashes were scattered at his ranch in Montana.

Legacy
Oates has a dedicated cult following because of his performances in Peckinpah's studio films and television shows, Monte Hellman's independent works, his films with Peter Fonda, and in a number of B movies from the 1970s. During a screening of Hellman's Two-Lane Blacktop, Richard Linklater introduced the film, and gave 16 reasons why viewers should love it. The sixth was: "Because there was once a god who walked the Earth named Warren Oates."

The documentary film Warren Oates: Across the Border was produced by Tom Thurman in 1993 as a tribute to the actor's career.

Oates was the subject of a 2009 biography, Warren Oates: A Wild Life, written by Susan Compo.

Filmography

Films

Television films

Television

 1956 The United States Steel Hour ("Operation Three R's") as Private Lear
 1956 The Big Story ("Reunion") as Danny (Adult)
 1957 Kraft Television Theatre ("Gun at a Fair One") as Milkman
 1956–1958 Westinghouse Studio One as 2nd Card Player
 1958–1967 Gunsmoke as Al Tresh / Chris Kelly / Deke Bassop / Speeler / Lafe / Tate Crocker / Billy 'Sweet Billy' Cathcart / Jep Galloway / Jed Hakes / Seth Pickett
 1958–1961 Wanted Dead Or Alive as Jesse Cox / Billy Clegg / George Aswell / Clem Robinson. Note: wrongly credited as "Warren Oats" as Jesse Cox in "Die by the Gun," Season 1, Episode 14, first aired 12/6/1958.
 1958 Rescue 8 ("Subterranean City") as Pete
 1958 The Adventures of Rin Tin Tin ("The Epidemic") as Deke
 1958 Playhouse 90 ("Seven Against The Wall") as Ted Ryan
 1958 Black Saddle ("Client: Steele") as Deputy Simms
 1958–1960 Tombstone Territory as Joe Clinton / Bob Pickett / Vic Reel
 1958–1960 Have Gun – Will Travel as John Bosworth / Harrison
 1959 Buckskin ("Charlie, My Boy") as Charlie
 1959 The Rough Riders ("The Rifle") as Frank Day
 1959 Trackdown as 'Lute' Borden / Kelly Hooker / Deputy Norvil
 1959 Wagon Train ("The Martha Barham Story") as Private Silas Carpenter
 1959 The Rebel ("School Days") as Troy Armbruster
 1959–1961 Bat Masterson as Sonny Parsons / 'Cat' Crail
 1960 Hotel de Paree ("Hard Luck for Sundance") as Charlie Aiken
 1960 Bronco ("Every Man a Hero") as Private Hurd Maple
 1960–1965 Rawhide as Marco / Charlie 'Rabbit' Waters / Weed / Jesse Gufler
 1960 Johnny Ringo ("Single Debt"), as Burt Scanlon
 1960 Tate ("Before Sunup) as Cowpoke
 1960 Wrangler ("Affair at the Trading Post") as Shep Martin
 1960 Outlaws ("Thirty a Month") as Bill Hooton
 1960 The Westerner ("Jeff") as Drunk
 1960 Lawman ("The Second Son") as Al May
 1960 Hawaiian Eye ("The Contenders") as Al
 1960 Michael Shayne ("Murder 'Round My Wrist") as Frank Hobbes
 1960 The Case of the Dangerous Robin ("Baubles and Bullets") as Unknown
 1961–1962 Target: The Corruptors! ("Mr. Megalomania" and "Journey into Mourning") as Unknown
 1961 Bat Masterson ("Members of Mimbres") as 'Cat' Craig, JB Villain
 1961 Laramie ("Two for the Gallows") as Pete Dixson
 1961 Stagecoach West as Billy Joe / Trooper Haig / Tom Lochlin
 1961 The Lawless Years ("Artie Moon") as Charlie Brown
 1961 The Dick Powell Show ("Somebody's Waiting") as Bruno
 1958–1962 The Rifleman ("The Day of Reckoning", "The Marshall", "Bloodlines", "The Prodigal") as Willie Breen / Andrew Sheltin / Jed Malakie 
 1960–1962 Thriller ("Knock Three-One-Two" & "The Hollow Watcher") as Unknown
 1960–1962 77 Sunset Strip as 'Dink' Strahman / Orville
 1962 Bonanza ("The Mountain Girl") as Unknown
 1962 The Untouchables ("Pressure") as Artie Krebs
 1962–1963 Stoney Burke as Ves Painter (Oates' only regular role on a television series)
 1963 The Twilight Zone "The Purple Testament" & "The 7th Is Made Up of Phantoms" as Unknown
 1963 The Travels of Jaimie McPheeters ("The Day of the First Suitor") as Eldon Bishop
 1963–1966 The Virginian as Corbie / Roy Judd / Bowers / Buxton
 1964 Combat! ("The Pillbox") as Soldier Stark
 1964 The Outer Limits ("The Mutant")  as Reese Fowler
 1964 The Fugitive ("Devil's Carnival" & "Rat in a Corner") as Hanes McClure / Herbie Grant
 1964 The Reporter ("No Comment") as Mickroe
 1965 Bob Hope Presents the Chrysler Theatre ("The War" & "Eric Kurtz") as Joe Grover
 1965 Branded ("Judge Not") as Pierce / Frank
 1965 A Man Called Shenandoah ("The Fort") as Sergeant Ryder
 1965 Slattery's People as Eugene Henson / Stu Burns
 1965 Twelve O'Clock High as Lieutenant Colonel Troper
 1965 Lost in Space ("Welcome Stranger") as Jimmy Hapgood
 1965–1966 The Big Valley as Korby Kyles / Duke
 1966 The Monroes as Nick Beresford
 1966 Shane as Kemp Spicer
 1967 Dundee and the Culhane as Lafe Doolin
 1967 The Iron Horse as Hode Avery
 1967 Cimarron Strip as Mobeetie
 1968 Run for Your Life as Deputy Potter
 1968 Disneyland as John Blythe
 1969–1970 Lancer as Sheriff Val Crawford / Drago
 1971 The F.B.I. as Richie Billings
 1971 The Name of the Game as John Lew Weatherford
 1978 Black Beauty as Jerry Barker
 1973 Police Story as Richey Neptune
 1979 Insight as Unknown
 1981 East of Eden as Cyrus Trask
 1982 The Blue and the Gray as Major 'Preacher' Welles (released posthumously)
 1985 Tales of the Unexpected as Harry (filmed in 1981; released posthumously; final role)

References

External links
 
 
 
 Time magazine interview

1928 births
1982 deaths
20th-century American male actors
American male film actors
American male television actors
American people of English descent
American people of Scottish descent
American people of Welsh descent
Ranchers from Montana
Male actors from Kentucky
Male actors from Los Angeles
Male actors from Louisville, Kentucky
Male Western (genre) film actors
People from Muhlenberg County, Kentucky
United States Marines
University of Louisville alumni
Louisville Male High School alumni
Western (genre) television actors